Milan Ptáček (born 27 January 1970) is a retired Czech football defender.

References

1970 births
Living people
Czech footballers
FC Hradec Králové players
Czech First League players
Association football defenders
Place of birth missing (living people)